Michael "Mike" Bird (born 7 November 1983) is an English former professional footballer who played at schoolboy level for Wales. He played for clubs in all four constituent countries of the United Kingdom - England, Scotland, Northern Ireland and Wales.

He is currently a coach at Blackpool's Centre of Excellence.

Career

Playing career
Bird started his career at Bolton Wanderers where he was a graduate of their Youth Academy. After impressing in a trial, he signed for Scottish Premier League club Aberdeen on 15 May 2003 on a free transfer where he made two league appearances, both as a substitute, and one League Cup appearance, also as a sub. After being made available for transfer in the transfer window, he moved to Northern Ireland to play for Irish Premier League club Glenavon in February 2004. In June 2004 he moved back to England into non-league football with Northwich Victoria, before signing for local rivals Witton Albion. He then moved to Wales in December 2004 to play for Welsh Premier League club Caernarfon Town where he spent the rest of the 2004-05 season.

He had a brief spell at the start of the 2005-06 season with Warrington Town before signing for Colwyn Bay on 2 September 2005.

Michael had a brief spell playing for North Leigh in 2014.

Coaching career
Bird used to be a qualified coach, having obtained the UEFA B coaching licence. He was the coach of the Under-11 team at Blackpool's Centre of Excellence.

Teaching career
Bird used to be a teacher, head of year, assistant headteacher, and deputy headteacher in Oxfordshire. He is currently a deputy head teacher at Ellesmere Park High School.

References

External links

Living people
1983 births
English footballers
Sportspeople from Chester
Association football forwards
Bolton Wanderers F.C. players
Aberdeen F.C. players
Glenavon F.C. players
Northwich Victoria F.C. players
Witton Albion F.C. players
Caernarfon Town F.C. players
Warrington Town F.C. players
Colwyn Bay F.C. players
Central United F.C. players
North Leigh F.C. players
Scottish Premier League players
NIFL Premiership players